NGC 6905, also known as the Blue Flash Nebula, is a planetary nebula in the constellation Delphinus. It was discovered by William Herschel in 1784. The central star is 14.0 mag. The distance of the nebula, as with most planetary nebulae, is not well determined and estimates range between 1.7 and 2.6 kpc.

The shape of NGC 6905 is characterised by an internal shell with angular dimensions 47" ×34" and roughly conical extensions, with ansae-type formations along the major axis. The nucleus of the nebula possesses one of the most broad emission of OVI emission lines among planetary nebulae. Moreover, OVIII emission has been detected in NGC 6905. The ansae were particularly intense in NII.

The central star has a spectral type of [WO2], meaning it has a spectrum similar to those of Wolf–Rayet stars and is rich in oxygen; it is estimated to have a surface temperature of 150,000 K. The spectrum also shows signs of neon emission lines. An analysis of Gaia data suggests that the central star may be a binary system.

NGC 6905 can be detected under dark skies with a 4-inch telescope, but it better observed with larger instruments.

References

External links 
 

Planetary nebulae
Delphinus (constellation)
6905